Qaraoğlan  may refer to:
Qaraoğlan, Agdash, Azerbaijan
Qaraoğlan, Yevlakh, Azerbaijan

See also
 Karaoğlan
 Karaoğlan, Mustafakemalpaşa
 Thomas Karaoglan